Tomoko Konoike (鴻池朋子) (born 1960) is a Japanese contemporary multimedia artist. She is best known for her large-scale installations and Nihonga-style surreal paintings.

Biography 
Konoike was born in Akita, Japan. She graduated from the Department of Japanese Painting at the Tokyo University of the Arts. She worked as a toy designer before becoming a professional artist in 1988. She took a short hiatus from her artistic practice after the 2011 Tōhoku earthquake and tsunami.

Artwork 
As an artist, Konoike explores themes from mythology, folklore, and nature to create surreal and vibrant depictions of humans and animals in a range of media. Her work includes animation, drawing, painting, mixed-media sculpture and installations, textiles, and prints.

Konoike regularly exhibits her work solo both in Japan and abroad, and has taken part in several international group exhibitions. Her work is included in the collections of museums such as the Art Institute of Chicago, the Mori Art Museum, the Ohara Museum of Art, and the Spencer Museum of Art In 2016, Konoike was awarded the Japanese Ministry of Education’s Art Encouragement Prize for her solo exhibition Primordial Violence.

Exhibitions

Solo exhibitions 
 The Planets Are Temporarily Hidden by Clouds, 2006, Mizuma Gallery, Naka-Meguro
 Chapter #0, 2006, Ohara Museum of Art, Okayama
 Inter-Traveller (Playing with Myth), 2009, Tokyo Opera City Art Gallery
 Earthshine, 2013, Gallery Wendi Norris, San Francisco
 Skin, Needle, Thread, 2016, Niigata Bandaijima Art Museum
 Primordial Violence, 2015-17, Kanagawa Kenmin Hall, the Museum of Modern Art, Gunma, and the Niigata Bandaijima Art Museum.
 Fur Story, 2018, Leeds Arts University
 Little Fur Anger, 2018, Gallery Kido Press
 Hunter Gatherer, 2018, Akita Museum of Modern Art
 FLIP (Jam Session: The Ishibashi Foundation Collection x Tomoko Konoike), 2020, Artizon Museum
 Stories Stitched and Sewn, 2021, Centre for Contemporary Arts
 The Birth of Seeing, 2022, Takamatsu Art Museum

Group exhibitions 

 Guangzhou Triennale, 2008
 Busan Biennale, 2010
 Temporal Turn, 2016, Spencer Museum of Art, University of Kansas
 Nous, 2016, 21st Century Museum of Contemporary Art, Kanazawa
 Japan—Spirits of Nature, 2017, Nordic Watercolor Museum
 Oku-Noto Triennale, 2017
 Echoes from the Past, 2019, Kerava Art Museum
 Setouchi International Art Festival 2019
 Timeless Conversations, 2020, National Art Center, Tokyo
 Glasgow International 2021
 Doraemon Exhibition, 2022, National Museum of Singapore

References

1960 births
Living people
20th-century Japanese women artists
21st-century Japanese women artists
Tokyo University of the Arts alumni
Japanese contemporary artists